The San Agustin Parish Church (Spanish: Iglesia Parroquial de San Agustín), also known as the Lubao Church, is a 17th-century Neo-classic, Spanish stone and brick church located at Brgy. San Nicolas 1st, Lubao, Pampanga, Philippines. In 1952, a historical marker bearing a brief history of the structure was installed on the facade of the church by the Historical Committee of the Philippines, precursor of the National Historical Commission of the Philippines. In 2013, the church has been declared by the National Museum of the Philippines as an Important Cultural Property.

History
Lubao has been annexed to Tondo as a visita (mission) on May 3, 1572. Soon after, on March 5, 1575, Father Provincial Alfonso Alvarado was assigned to lead the convent of Lubao. The volume of baptisms signed on the baptismal book of Lubao attests to the importance of Lubao as a missionary center. 

The history of the current edifice has several versions. One source tells of a Fr. Juan Gallegos, assigned as the first resident priest of Lubao, who organized the early settlement and made the church structures of light materials in a place called Sitio Sapang Pare, a landing place for missionaries coming in from Manila Bay and the tributaries of the Pampanga river. Eventually, the settlement was transferred to its present site. Other sources assert that it was Father Francisco Coronel who founded and established the town at its present site and started building the current edifice. Still other references refute this claim stating that Father Coronel had only stayed in Lubao in 1613 and never came back. Father Jeronimo de Venasque continued the construction in 1635 and it was completed by Father Francisco Figueroa in 1638. Father Antonio Bravo did some repair work in 1877, and in 1893 Father Antonio Moradillo commissioned Italian artists Dibella and Alberoni to paint the ceiling of the nave, along with other ornamentations. The cemetery chapel and stone gate have also been attributed to Father Moradilla. The church and convent were occupied by the Philippine revolutionaries in 1898. They were damaged in 1945 by Japanese bombing during World War II and in 1952 during a strong typhoon. The church was restored in 1954.

Architecture
The church measures 82.45 meters long, 21.12 meters wide and 10.50 meters high with stone and brick walls 2.46 meters thick. The five-story bell tower attached to the left of the facade is 31 meters high. The flat surface of facade is bare of ornamentation save for the central retablo of niches, fluted pilasters and Ionic columns in Neoclassical style. The facade has one semicircular-arched main door and three rectangular windows on the second level. The facade is crowned by an imaginary triangular pediment topped by a cross. As of 2014, the rough brick surface of the facade had been replaced.

Inscriptions on the church structure
To recognize the cultural significance of the San Agustin Church, three significant inscriptions have been placed on the church: one from the National Historical Committee, (now the National Historical Commission of the Philippines), the parish of Lubao, and the National Museum of the Philippines:

1952 National Historical Committee marker

1982 Lubao Parish Church commemorative marker for President Diosdado P. Macapagal

2013 National Museum of the Philippines marker for Important Cultural Property
In accordance with the requirements of the National Museum in declaring Important Cultural Properties, the San Agustin church has been declared as such because of its significant architectural features and altarpiece. According to the National Museum, the Important Cultural Property title is the second highest title granted by the institution to heritage structures (next to the National Cultural Treasure). Accordingly, the San Agustin church did not pass requirements to be declared a National Cultural Treasure because what remains of the original structure is less than 60 percent.

Image gallery

2019 Luzon earthquake 

On April 22, 2019, a 6.1 magnitude earthquake struck the island of Luzon in the Philippines, leaving at least 18 dead, three missing and injuring at least 256 others. Despite of the epicenter was in Zambales, most of the damage to infrastructure occurred in the neighboring province of Pampanga, which suffered damage to 29 buildings and structures, including churches.

During the 2019 Luzon earthquake, the church's belfry collapsed. Rebuilding the belfry and repairing the church’s floor cost more than 10 million pesos.

See also

 List of Cultural Properties of the Philippines

References

Roman Catholic churches in Pampanga
Roman Catholic churches completed in 1638
1630s establishments in the Philippines
Important Cultural Properties of the Philippines
Spanish Colonial architecture in the Philippines
Baroque church buildings in the Philippines
17th-century Roman Catholic church buildings in the Philippines
Churches in the Roman Catholic Archdiocese of San Fernando